Summer Jam is the annual hip-hop fest held in East Rutherford, New Jersey and sponsored by New York-based radio station Hot 97FM. Normally held in June, the concert features the most popular acts that hip hop and R&B have to offer in a particular year.

The hip-hop summer festival format was originally pioneered and popularized by San Francisco radio station KMEL with their large-scale Summer Jam concerts from 1987 through the 1990s and present day. KMEL continues to host smaller versions of the event annually. Similarly, Los Angeles station KKBT held an annual Summer Jam hip-hop concert during the 1990s after hiring KMEL's Program Director in 1993. The concert was discontinued as the station switched formats.

The concert has increasingly  become a scene of drug use and violence over the years. A recent festival held on June 7, 2015 included a riot in the stadium parking lot. The disturbance began when crowds of people without tickets attempted to enter the stadium anyway by climbing over the fence and were stopped by New Jersey State Police. At this time, the decision to close all gates to the stadium was made and those in the parking lot were asked to leave. Instead of leaving, the crowd began throwing glass bottles and other objects at police. The police responded with riot gear, armored vehicles, and pepper spray. Multiple arrests were made.

See also

List of hip hop music festivals
Hip hop culture

References

Hip hop music festivals in the United States
Music festivals established in 1994
Music festivals in New Jersey